Paramenesia is a genus of longhorn beetles of the subfamily Lamiinae, containing the following species:

 Paramenesia kasugensis (Seki & Kobayashi, 1935)
 Paramenesia nigrescens Breuning, 1966
 Paramenesia subcarinata (Gressitt, 1951)
 Paramenesia theaphia (Bates, 1884)

References

Saperdini